Art Buidhe Mac Murchadha Caomhánach was a king was known as "Art the Yellow" who ruled Leinster from 1511 to 1518.  He was succeeded by his brother Gerald of Ferns.

References

Kings of Leinster
People from County Wexford
16th-century Irish monarchs
Year of birth unknown 
Year of death unknown 
15th-century births
16th-century deaths